Magic Mike is a 2012 American comedy-drama film directed by Steven Soderbergh and starring Channing Tatum, Alex Pettyfer, Matt Bomer, Joe Manganiello, and Matthew McConaughey. The plot revolves around Adam, a 19-year-old who enters the world of male stripping, guided by Mike Lane, who has been in the business for six years.

The film is loosely based on the experiences of Tatum, who was an 18-year-old male stripper in Tampa, Florida. Magic Mike was filmed in several locations around west central Florida. The film premiered as the closing film for the 2012 Los Angeles Film Festival on June 24, 2012, and was widely released by Warner Bros. on June 29, 2012, and was a critical and commercial success.

A sequel, Magic Mike XXL directed by Gregory Jacobs, was released on July 1, 2015. A third and final film, Magic Mike's Last Dance, was released on February 10, 2023, with Soderbergh returning to direct.

Plot
Mike Lane has big plans for a business of his own but pays his bills through a series of odd jobs, most notably performing as the star stripper at the Xquisite Strip Club in Tampa, a club owned by Dallas, who has dreams of creating an "empire" of strip clubs.

Mike soon meets 19-year-old Adam, a recent college dropout looking for a construction job. Mike takes Adam under his wing and encourages him to begin stripping at Xquisite. Mike is introduced to Adam's sister Brooke. Despite his on-and-off relationship with a woman named Joanna, Mike finds himself attracted to Brooke and promises to look after Adam.

Adam falls further into the excessive lifestyle of the Xquisite dancers, using drugs and having sexual encounters with many clients. When Dallas announces he has a plan to move their act to Miami, Mike confides in Brooke that he is tiring of the lifestyle and wants to get a small business loan to pursue his dream of opening a custom furniture business. The bank declines his loan application and Mike realizes that he has to stay in the business to continue to pay his bills. Mike later attends a hurricane party at Dallas' house, where Adam becomes part of a scheme created by Tobias, Xquisite's DJ, to sell drugs to Xquisite's clients, and is eventually given a package of ecstasy. Adam begins using drugs regularly, and Mike notices more of Adam's reckless behavior, to the chagrin of Brooke, who is relying on Mike to protect him.

A few days later, Mike and Adam perform for a private party at a sorority house where Adam brings the package of drugs with him. At the party, Adam gives a young woman an ecstasy pill, causing a brawl between Adam and the woman's boyfriend. Mike and Adam are forced to flee without the drugs, which Adam says were worth $1,000. They also do not collect their payment, which infuriates Dallas. After the next night's show, Mike and Adam take drugs and go to a club. Adam vomits and passes out; Brooke finds him on Mike's floor the next morning. Brooke angrily confronts Mike about his lifestyle, and ends her friendship with him. Tobias and his suppliers break into Mike's house looking for Adam, revealing that the drugs were actually worth $10,000. Mike gives up most of his life savings to pay Adam's debt in full.

Later, before the dancers' final performance at Xquisite, Mike decides he has had enough. Knowing that Dallas has no loyalty to any of them and is driven by greed, Mike leaves the club through the back. After realizing Mike is not coming back, Dallas promotes Adam to replace Mike as lead dancer. Mike drives to Brooke's apartment and tells her he has quit stripping. She has learned what he did for Adam, and she invites him to join her for breakfast. She playfully asks what they can do until morning, and then kisses him.

Cast
Channing Tatum as Michael "Magic Mike" Lane, a male stripper who performs at Xquisite.
Alex Pettyfer as Adam "The Kid", Mike's protege who befriends him.
Cody Horn as Brooke, Adam's sister and Mike's love interest
Olivia Munn as Joanna, Mike's on-again, off-again lover.
Matthew McConaughey as Dallas, a former stripper who owns Xquisite and is Mike's boss.
Joe Manganiello as Big Dick Richie
Matt Bomer as Ken
Adam Rodriguez as Tito
Kevin Nash as Tarzan
Gabriel Iglesias as Tobias
Mircea Monroe as Mercedes
Camryn Grimes as Birthday Girl
Riley Keough as Nora
Wendi McLendon-Covey as Tara
Martin Villeneuve as Marty boy
Michael Roark as Ryan
Betsy Brandt as Banker

Production

Development
Magic Mike is directed by Steven Soderbergh based on a screenplay by Reid Carolin, who is also one of the film's producers. The screenplay is in part inspired by Channing Tatum's experiences as a male stripper in Tampa, Florida, when he was 18 years old. Tatum said that he wanted to capture the atmosphere and energy of his past as a male stripper, but that the film is fictional, which allowed them to create their own scenarios. The project, announced in April 2011 was co-financed by Soderbergh and Tatum. Soderbergh was hired to direct after getting fired from Moneyball. In 2010, Tatum told an Australian newspaper that he would like to make a movie about his experiences as a male stripper, saying, "I've already got the director picked out. I'd like Nicolas Refn, who did the film Bronson, to do it because he's insane for it." Refn initially agreed on doing the film because Tatum and he were going to do another movie together. However, since that project did not get off the ground and due to his busy schedule, Tatum, who was then working with Soderbergh on Haywire, brought him the idea. After Soderbergh cast Tatum and Pettyfer in the lead roles, Carolin spent time revising the screenplay. He wrote the first draft in a month. Soderbergh suggested showing two points of view in the film: seeing through the eyes of young Adam and of his mentor Mike.

The dance numbers were choreographed by Alison Faulk, while Christopher Peterson was in charge of the costumes design and Frankie Pine supervised the music. Over the film, several dance numbers were performed. Music producer Jack Rayner created a special dubstep version of the song "It's Raining Men" sung by Countré Black for the dance sequence that features the ensemble for the first time together without The Kid. For that sequence, Peterson chose to use spray glitter on the umbrellas and raincoats to give them a wet effect. The Kid's first strip did not purposely have any choreography and it was Pettyfer's idea to show his bottom. Before doing his moves, Pettyfer did not know the song that was going to be played which ended up being Madonna's "Like a Virgin" performed by Nashville recording artist Chris Mitchell. The five-stripper group performed the song "Sound Off (The Duckworth Chant)" with lyric changes on the military-themed number. The scene during which Mike and Adam arrive at a sorority house dressed as cops was not in the original script but was Peterson's idea. Music supervisor Pine initially planned to use Kid Rock's "Cowboy" for the cowboy-themed number featuring The Kid. When it was not possible, she chose Big & Rich's "Save a Horse (Ride a Cowboy)" instead. Knowing Tatum's dance skills, Faulk gave him the permission to freestyle for Mike's last solo dance on the dubstep song "Calypso" by Excision and Datsik. McConaughey who had no stripping scene in the original script requested to have one which became the last dance number during which he first sings "Ladies of Tampa" and then strips. The song was written in three hours by music supervisor Frankie Pine, Matthew McConaughey and Martin Blasick, McConaughey's guitar coach. The thongs were made by company Pistol Pete.

Casting
On August 16, 2011, it was reported that Matthew McConaughey had landed a role in the film. He was the first person cast, aside from Tatum. McConaughey revealed that Soderbergh called him to offer him the role of Dallas. After Soderbergh pitched him the story, McConaughey laughed and in 10 minutes he accepted the role. It was the second time he accepted a role over the phone; the first time was for a Richard Linklater film. Commenting on the role, the actor said: "I knew that I was just going to be able to fly. It was really fun to play someone so committed, in many ways." Joe Manganiello accepted the role of Big Dick Richie after talking to What to Expect When You're Expecting co-star Chris Rock who convinced him to do it. Cody Horn gave her insight on how she got the part of Brooke:

The cast visited a strip club to see what this world was like and the dance routines and to get information on the backstage life. To prepare for the role, McConaughey went in a Los Angeles strip mall to get used to regular waxing. Matt Bomer had to put on about 15 pounds for his part. Adam Rodriguez went through a cardio and weights training.

Filming
Principal photography commenced in Playa del Rey, Los Angeles in September 2011 and concluded in Tampa by late October. The scenes that took place in the fictional club Xquisite were filmed in Studio City, Los Angeles. Locations in Florida included the Fort Desoto Bridge, the Dunedin coast, the Gulf of Mexico, Tampa, Ybor City, St. Petersburg, Tarpon Springs, and Tierra Verde. Soderbergh chose to shoot the entirety of the film with a double straw camera filter, except the interior of the club.

Music

The soundtrack was released on June 28, 2012, through WaterTower Music. Other songs featured in the film include Cobra Starship's "#1Nite", Sean Paul's "Got 2 Luv U", and Ginuwine's "Pony".

Track listing

Release
Warner Bros. Pictures acquired US distribution rights to the independently produced film on October 27, 2011. Magic Mike was first screened at the Los Angeles Film Festival as the closing film on June 24, 2012, and was widely released on June 29, 2012, in the United States.

Marketing
The first full-length trailer for Magic Mike was released on iTunes on April 18, 2012, with a poster indicating the film's name. The first poster featuring the cast was released on June 1, 2012, along with a new trailer. A second poster followed on June 4, 2012, and a fourth trailer was released on June 13, 2012. To promote the film, Channing Tatum, Matthew McConaughey, Joe Manganiello and Matt Bomer participated in a photo shoot for Entertainment Weekly that came out in the May 25, 2012, issue. On June 3, 2012, Tatum, McConaughey, and Manganiello attended the MTV Movie Awards where they presented the award for Best On-Screen Transformation. During the presentation, Manganiello arrived dressed as a fireman stripper.

The promotional campaign, which originally centered on straight women, also targeted gay men after it had been made clear that there was a strong interest among them. Warner Bros. enlisted entertainment marketing agency the Kartel Group to market the film to gay men. Website AfterElton.com noted that gay men could not connect with the first trailer as the film "was marketed as a romantic comedy" through Tatum and Horn's relationship, but that it changed when the campaign also focused on "the male form part of it [the film]" through a red-band trailer (the fourth one). In June 2012, a Magic Mike float was included in the West Hollywood gay pride parade and in other gay pride events such as in New York and in San Francisco.

Box office
Magic Mike proved to be a box office hit, grossing $113,721,571 and $53,500,000 outside North America with a total gross of $167,221,571 worldwide from a modest $7 million budget; it is the top-grossing movie under the Dance genre. On its opening day (June 29, 2012), the film performed better than expected, earning about $19 million including a $2 million midnight run. It finished the weekend at the second spot behind Ted with a total of $39,127,170. It was the first time two R-rated films grossed more than $21 million each during a weekend.

On its opening weekend, Magic Mike attracted an audience of 73% females, with 43% of the audience being over the age of 35. Dan Fellman, Warner Bros. Pictures President of Domestic Distribution, said this phenomenon could be compared to Sex and the City, which had also appealed to large groups of women.

Magic Mike was more successful in red states than in blue ones. Ticket sales in St. Louis and Nashville was more than 30% over the average. However ticket sales in New York City was 30% below the average.

Critical response
On Rotten Tomatoes, the film has an approval rating of 78% based on 218 reviews, with an average rating of 6.90/10. The site's critical consensus reads, "Magic Mike sensitive direction, smart screenplay, and strong performances allows audiences to have their beefcake and eat it too." On Metacritic, which assigns a normalized rating based reviews from mainstream critics, the film has a score of 72 out of 100, based on 38 critics indicating "generally favorable reviews". Audiences polled by CinemaScore gave the film an average grade of "B" on an A+ to F scale.

Roger Ebert of the Chicago Sun-Times gave the film three out of four stars, and wrote "Selling anyone the right to touch your genital area for a couple of bucks is not a good way to build self-esteem. Steven Soderbergh's Magic Mike makes this argument with a crafty mixture of comedy, romance, melodrama and some remarkably well-staged strip routines involving hunky, good-looking guys." Kofi Outlaw of Screen Rant called the film, "a subtle social commentary on blue-collar struggle and the pitfalls of the American Dream."

The movie also launched Academy Award buzz for Matthew McConaughey as Dallas. However, he was not selected for inclusion among the nominees, which was described as a "snub" by many.

Top ten lists
Magic Mike was listed on many critics' top ten lists.

 2nd: Kyle Smith, New York Post
 4th: Sam Adams, The A.V. Club
 4th: Peter Knegt, Indiewire
 5th: Guy Lodge, HitFix
 5th: David Fear, Time Out New York
 5th: Drew Taylor, Indiewire
 6th: Rafer Guzmán, Newsday
 6th: Melissa Anderson, The Village Voice
 7th: Katie Walsh, Indiewire
 7th: Elizabeth Weitzman, Daily News (New York)
 9th: Gabe Toro, Indiewire
 10th: Aaron Hills, The Village Voice
 Top 10 (ranked alphabetically): Richard Brody, The New Yorker
 Top 10 (ranked alphabetically): Nick Pinkerton, The Village Voice

Accolades

Home media
Magic Mike was released on DVD and Blu-ray on October 23, 2012. Within its first week, 698,497 DVD units were sold, generating revenue of $10,449,515. As of December 23, 2012, DVD sales totaled over 1.9 million units with $26,362,047 in revenue.

Sequels

In a Twitter Q&A in July 2012, Tatum confirmed work on a sequel: "Yes, yes and yes! We're working on the concept now. We want to flip the script and make it bigger." By March 2014, Magic Mike first assistant director Gregory Jacobs had been chosen to direct the sequel, titled Magic Mike XXL, which began shooting in late 2014. The film was released on July 1, 2015. 

A third film, Magic Mike's Last Dance, was announced on November 29, 2021, with Soderbergh returning to direct. The film was released on February 10, 2023.

Stage musical
Reid Carolin, who wrote the film, is adapting the film as a stage musical for Broadway.

It was confirmed on 3 June 2018 in the UK on Britain's Got Talent live final that a UK version of Magic Mike would be put into production and would begin in November 2018. Magic Mike Live London opened at the Hippodrome Casino in Leicester Square on 10 November 2018. with original cast including Samantha Baines and David Morgan and directed by Channing Tatum.

TV series
A reality competition television series, titled Finding Magic Mike was ordered for HBO Max in April 2021 with Tatum and Soderbergh as executive producers. It premiered on December 16, 2021, produced by Eureka Productions and Warner Bros. Unscripted Television in association with Warner Horizon. In December 2022, it was announced the series was canceled and removed from HBO Max. The series was released on The Roku Channel and Tubi on February 1, 2023.

See also
 Australia's Thunder from Down Under
 Dreamboys
 Chippendales
 The Full Monty

References

External links

2012 films
2012 comedy-drama films
American comedy-drama films
American dance films
2010s English-language films
Films directed by Steven Soderbergh
Comedy-drama films based on actual events
Films set in Florida
Films set in Tampa, Florida
Films shot in Florida
Films shot in Los Angeles
American independent films
Warner Bros. films
Male erotic dance
American sexploitation films
Films about striptease
Films produced by Gregory Jacobs
2010s American films